
This is a list of Swiss inventors and discoverers. The following list comprises people from Switzerland, and also people of predominantly Swiss heritage, in alphabetical order of the surname.

A
 Carl Roman Abt inventor of Abt rack system
 Werner Arber, (nobel prize) discovered restriction endonucleases. Their work would lead to the development of recombinant DNA technology. 
 Aimé Argand, inventor of Argand lamp.

B

 Maximilian Bircher-Benner, invented modern muesli
 Felix Bloch, (nobel prize) discovered Bloch equations
 Johann Georg Bodmer
 Daniel Bovet (nobel prize), discovered drugs that block the actions of specific neurotransmitters. He is best known for his discovery in 1937 of antihistamines, which block the neurotransmitter histamine and are used in allergy medication.
 Jacques E. Brandenberger, inventor of cellophane

C

D

 Henry Dunant, (nobel prize), inventor of The Red Cross. He shared the Nobel Peace Prize in 1901 with Frédéric Passy, famous French Peace activist.

E
 Richard R. Ernst, contributions towards the development of Fourier transform nuclear magnetic resonance spectroscopy.

F
 Nicolas Fatio de Duillier
 Antoine Favre-Salomon
 Edmond H. Fischer (nobel prize), describing how reversible phosphorylation works as a switch to activate proteins and regulate various cellular processes.

G
 Charles Édouard Guillaume, (nobel prize) discovery of anomalies in nickel steel alloys.
 Gustav Guanella
 Marthe Gosteli, led the fight for women's right to vote in Switzerland

H

 Walter Rudolf Hess (nobel prize), mapping the areas of the brain involved in the control of internal organs.
 Wilhelm His, Sr., inventor of microtome
 Albert Hofmann, inventor of LSD

I

J

K
 Paul Karrer, (nobel prize), research on vitamins.
 Ursula Keller, developed the first method for generating ultra-fast light pulses known as semiconductor saturable-absorber mirrors (SESAMs)

 Emil Theodor Kocher (nobel prize), worked in the physiology, pathology and surgery of the thyroid.
 Elisabeth Kübler-Ross, a pioneer in near-death studies

L

M
 Georges de Mestral, inventor of Velcro
 Friedrich Miescher, discovered Nucleic acid, DNA (1868)
 K. Alex Müller

 Paul Hermann Müller, discovery of insecticidal qualities and use of DDT in the control of vector diseases such as malaria and yellow fever.

N

 Jean-Daniel Nicoud, inventor of Smaky

O

P

 Paracelsus, discovered Laudanum
 Jean Samuel Pauly, created the first fully self-contained cartridges
 Auguste Piccard, inventor of Bathyscaphe
 Vladimir Prelog (nobel prize),  research into the stereochemistry of organic molecules and reaction

Q

R
 Tadeus Reichstein, discovered Reichstein process
 Niklaus Riggenbach, inventor of the Riggenbach track system
 Daisy Roulland-Dussoix, discovered restriction enzymes

S

 Martin Schadt, co-inventor of twisted nematic field effect (TN-effect) 
 René Sommer, co-inventor of computer mouse

T
 René Thury

U

V

W
	 
 Alfred Werner (nobel prize), proposing the octahedral configuration of transition metal complexes. Werner developed the basis for modern coordination chemistry. 
 Niklaus Wirth, inventor of programming language Pascal.

 Kurt Wüthrich (nobel prize), developing Nuclear Magnetic Resonance (NMR) methods for studying biological macromolecules.

X

Y

Z
 Rolf M. Zinkernagel (nobel prize), discovery of how the immune system recognizes virus-infected cells.

See also
 List of Swiss inventions and discoveries
 Swiss people

References

External links

 
Inventors and discoverers
Swiss
Inventors and discoverers